The Vocational-Agriculture Building in Lovelock, Nevada, located at 1150 Elmhurst Ave. is a historic Moderne-style building that was built in 1941.  It is listed on the National Register of Historic Places.

It was a work of the National Youth Administration and it was a work of Reno architect Russell Mills.

It was listed on the National Register of Historic Places in 1991.

The building is now used for the Pershing County School District offices.

References 

National Register of Historic Places in Pershing County, Nevada
Streamline Moderne architecture in the United States
School buildings on the National Register of Historic Places in Nevada
Government buildings in Nevada
New Deal in Nevada
National Youth Administration